Anthony Cacace (born 2 February 1989) is an Irish professional boxer. He has held the British super-featherweight title since 2019 and the IBO super-featherweight title since 2022.

Professional career
Cacace made his professional debut on 25 February 2012, scoring a first-round technical knockout (TKO) victory over Ben Wager at the Emerald Roadhouse in Belfast, Northern Ireland. Followed three more wins—a points decision (PTS) over Kristian Laight in April; a sixth-round TKO over Mickey Coveney in July; and Aivaras Balsys by PTS in September—Cacace fought Mickey Coveney for a second time on 3 November 2012 at the National Basketball Arena in Dublin. Cacace won via first-round TKO to capture the BUI super-featherweight title. His final fight of 2012 was a PTS victory against Youssef al-Hamidi in December.

He gained decision victories over Zsolt Nagy in March and Osnel Charles in October 2013, followed by wins over Dawid Knade by TKO in September and Simas Volosinas by PTS in December 2014. He began 2015 with a PTS win over Santiago Bustos in February and a TKO win against Karoly Lakatos in June. His last fight of 2015 was against Ronnie Clark for the vacant Celtic super-featherweight title. The bout took place on 16 October at the Meadowbank Sports Centre in Edinburgh. Cacace captured the Celtic title via tenth-round TKO in a scheduled ten-round fight.

Following two fights in 2016—a corner retirement (RTD) win against Jamie Quinn in September and a PTS win over Leonel Hernandez in November—Cacace challenged British super-featherweight champion Martin J Ward on 15 July 2017, at the Wembley Arena in London, with the vacant Commonwealth title also on the line. In what was a close competitive fight, Cacace suffered the first defeat of his professional career , losing by unanimous decision (UD) over twelve rounds, with the judges' scorecards reading 116–113, 116–114 and 115–113, all in favour of Ward.

Following his defeat to Ward, Cacace gained a PTS victory over six rounds against Reynaldo Mora in December 2017. After 14 months out of the ring, Cacace was back in action in February 2019 with an eight-round PTS win over Alan Castillo.

Cacace, as the mandatory contender, was due to challenge for the British super-featherweight title on 3 August 2019 against reigning champion Sam Bowen, however, Bowen pulled out of the fight due to a back injury. The bout was rescheduled for 30 November at Arena Birmingham. Cacace won, capturing the British title via split decision (SD), with two judges scoring the bout 115–113 to Cacace while the third scored it 115–112 to Bowen.

Professional boxing record

References

External links

Living people
1989 births
Male boxers from Northern Ireland
Boxers from Belfast
Super-featherweight boxers
British Boxing Board of Control champions
British people of Italian descent